Wilfred George Lowton (3 October 1899 – 1963) was an English footballer who played in the Football League for Exeter City and Wolverhampton Wanderers.

References

1899 births
1963 deaths
English footballers
Association football forwards
English Football League players
Heavitree United F.C. players
Exeter City F.C. players
Wolverhampton Wanderers F.C. players